Bangladesh Samabaya Bank Limited is a cooperative bank located in Dhaka, Bangladesh.

History
In 1922 the Bengal provincial Co-operative Bank was founded to provide loans to farmers in Bengal. In 1947 the bank was temporarily closed following the Partition of India. The bank was placed under the East Pakistan provincial co-operatives ministry in Dhaka and renamed East Pakistan provincial co-operative bank ltd on 31 March 1948. It was renamed Bangladesh Jatiya Samabaya Bank Ltd after the Independence of Bangladesh. It was renamed to Bangladesh Samabaya Bank Ltd in 1977.

References

Banks of Bangladesh
Banks established in 1922
Organisations based in Dhaka
Indian companies established in 1922